"Rang Brown Ni" is a Punjabi  language song sung by Kaptan Laadi. Upon the release the song get captured positive reviews both from the critics and the audience. The video was released on 9 July 2019. it was the Going to the biggest hit of the following year. It has Feature the most popular dancer in India Sapna Choudhary

References

2019 songs
Punjabi-language songs